James Daniel Warner (May 1, 1924 - September 9, 2009) was bishop of the Episcopal Diocese of Nebraska from 1976 to 1990.

Early life and education
Warner was born on May 1, 1924, in Sheridan, Wyoming, the son of Stephan Daniel Warner and Grace Margaret Caple. He served in the US Navy during World War II, after which he then attended Northwestern University, and graduated with a Bachelor of Science in 1950. He went on to study at Seabury-Western Theological Seminary, where he earned a Master of Divinity in 1953, and awarded a Doctor of Divinity in 1977.

Ordained Ministry
Warner was ordained deacon on March 28, 1953, in All Saints' Church, Appleton, Wisconsin, by Bishop William H. Brady, Coadjutor of Fond du Lac. He was ordained priest that same year on October 3, by the Bishop of Fond du Lac Harwood Sturtevant, in St John's Church, Wisconsin Rapids, Wisconsin. He served as vicar of St James' Church in Mosinee, Wisconsin between 1953 and 1956, and then as rector of St Paul's Church in Marinette, Wisconsin between 1956 and 1960. He moved to Wichita, Kansas in 1960, to become assistant chaplain at St James' Church in Wichita, Kansas. He then served as rector of St Stephen's Church in Wichita between 1962 and 1970. In 1970, he became rector of Trinity Church in Oshkosh, Wisconsin, where he remained until 1976.

Bishop
On August 27, 1976, Warner was elected on the third ballot as Bishop of Nebraska at a special council held in St Mark's Pro-Cathedral. He was consecrated on November 30, 1976, in St Cecilia's Cathedral, by Presiding Bishop John Allin. During his episcopacy, he promoted ecumenism, and was instrumental in organising a shared Holy Communion on March 13, 1983, between Lutherans and Episcopalians at Trinity Cathedral. Warner retired in 1989.

Family
Warner married Barbara A. Wallgren on September 6, 1952, who died in 1957. He then married Marcy Walk Swan on February 8, 1960. He had seven children; Stephen, David, Cheryl, Mark, Kathryn, James, and Tammy.

References

2009 deaths
1924 births
Northwestern University alumni
Seabury-Western Theological Seminary alumni
Episcopal bishops of Nebraska
20th-century American clergy
United States Navy personnel of World War II